The Shang dynasty, also known as the Yin dynasty, was a Chinese royal dynasty founded by Tang of Shang (Cheng Tang) that ruled in the Yellow River valley in the second millennium BC, traditionally succeeding the Xia dynasty and followed by the Western Zhou dynasty. The classic account of the Shang comes from texts such as the Book of Documents, Bamboo Annals and Records of the Grand Historian. According to the traditional chronology based on calculations made approximately 2,000 years ago by Liu Xin, the Shang ruled from 1766 to 1122 BC, but most recent scholarship has preferred the 16th to 11th centuries BC.

The Shang dynasty is the earliest dynasty of traditional Chinese history firmly supported by archaeological evidence. Excavation at the Ruins of Yin (near modern-day Anyang), which has been identified as the last Shang capital, uncovered eleven major royal tombs and the foundations of palaces and ritual sites, containing weapons of war and remains from both animal and human sacrifices. Tens of thousands of bronze, jade, stone, bone, and ceramic artifacts have been found.

The Anyang site has yielded the earliest known body of Chinese writing, mostly divinations inscribed on oracle bones – turtle shells, ox scapulae, or other bones. More than 20,000 were discovered in the initial scientific excavations during the 1920s and 1930s, and over four times as many have been found since. The inscriptions provide critical insight into many topics from the politics, economy, and religious practices to the art and medicine of this early stage of Chinese civilization.

Traditional accounts
Many events concerning the Shang dynasty are mentioned in various Chinese classics, including the Book of Documents, the Mencius and the Zuo Zhuan. Working from all the available documents, the Han dynasty historian Sima Qian assembled a sequential account of the Shang dynasty as part of his Records of the Grand Historian. His history describes some events in detail, while in other cases only the name of a king is given. A closely related, but slightly different, account is given by the Bamboo Annals. The Annals were interred in 296 BC, but the text has a complex history, and the authenticity of the surviving versions is controversial.

The name Yīn (殷) is used by Sima Qian for the dynasty, and in the "current text" version of the Bamboo Annals for both the dynasty and its final capital. It has been a popular name for the Shang throughout history. Since the Records of Emperors and Kings by Huangfu Mi (3rd century AD), it has often been used specifically to describe the later half of the Shang dynasty. In Japan and Korea, the Shang are still referred to almost exclusively as the Yin (In and eun, respectively for Japan and Korea) dynasty. However, it seems to have been a Zhou name for the earlier dynasty. The word does not appear in the oracle bones, which refer to the state as Shāng (商), and the capital as Dàyì Shāng (大邑商 "Great Settlement Shang"). It also does not appear in securely dated Western Zhou bronze inscriptions.

Founding myth
The founding myth of the Shang dynasty is described by Sima Qian in the Annals of the Yin. In the text, a woman named Jiandi (簡狄), who was the second wife of Emperor Ku, swallowed an egg dropped by a black bird (玄鳥) and subsequently gave birth miraculously to Xie (偰) – also appearing as Qi (契). Xie is said to have helped Yu the Great to control the Great Flood and for his service to have been granted a place called Shang as a fief.

Dynastic course
In the Annals of the Yin, Sima Qian writes that the dynasty was founded 13 generations after Xie, when Xie's descendant Tang overthrew the impious and cruel final Xia ruler in the Battle of Mingtiao. The Records of the Grand Historian recount events from the reigns of Tang, Tai Jia, Tai Wu, Pan Geng, Wu Ding, Wu Yi and the depraved final king Di Xin, but the rest of the Shang rulers are merely mentioned by name. In the last century, Wang Guowei demonstrated that the succession to the Shang throne matched the list of kings in Sima Qian's Records of the Grand Historian. According to the Records of the Grand Historian, the Shang moved their capital five times, with the final move to Yin in the reign of Pan Geng inaugurating the golden age of the dynasty.

Di Xin, the last Shang king, is said to have committed suicide after his army was defeated by Wu of Zhou. Legends say that his army and his equipped slaves betrayed him by joining the Zhou rebels in the decisive Battle of Muye. According to the Yi Zhou Shu and Mencius the battle was very bloody. The classic, Ming-era novel Fengshen Yanyi retells the story of the war between Shang and Zhou as a conflict with rival factions of gods supporting different sides in the war.

After the Shang were defeated, King Wu allowed Di Xin's son Wu Geng to rule the Shang as a vassal kingdom. However, Zhou Wu sent three of his brothers and an army to ensure that Wu Geng would not rebel. After Zhou Wu's death, the Shang joined the Rebellion of the Three Guards against the Duke of Zhou, but the rebellion collapsed after three years, leaving Zhou in control of Shang territory.

Descendants of the Shang royal family
After the collapse of the Shang dynasty, Zhou's rulers forcibly relocated "Yin diehards" (殷頑) and scattered them throughout Zhou territory. Some surviving members of the Shang royal family collectively changed their surname from the ancestral name Zi (子) to the name of their fallen dynasty, Yin (i.e. Shang). The family retained an aristocratic standing and often provided needed administrative services to the succeeding Zhou dynasty. King Wu of Zhou ennobled Lin Jian (林堅), the son of Prince Bigan, as the Duke of Bo'ling. The Records of the Grand Historian states that King Cheng of Zhou, with the support of his regent and uncle, the Duke of Zhou, enfeoffed Weiziqi (微子啟), a brother of Di Xin, as the Duke of Song, with its capital at Shangqiu. This practice was known as 二王三恪 ("enfeoffment of three generations for two kings"). The Dukes of Song would maintain rites honoring the Shang kings until Qi conquered Song in 286 BC. Confucius was possibly a descendant of the Shang Kings through the Dukes of Song.

The Eastern Han dynasty bestowed the title of Duke of Song and "Duke Who Continues and Honours the Yin" (殷紹嘉公) upon Kong An (孔安 (東漢)) because he was part of the Shang dynasty's legacy. This branch of the Confucius family is a separate branch from the line that held the title of Marquis of Fengsheng village and later Duke Yansheng.

Another remnant of the Shang established the vassal state of Guzhu (located in present-day Tangshan), which Duke Huan of Qi destroyed. Many Shang clans that migrated northeast after the dynasty's collapse were integrated into Yan culture during the Western Zhou period. These clans maintained an élite status and continued practicing the sacrificial and burial traditions of the Shang.

Both Korean and Chinese legends, including reports in the Book of Documents and the Bamboo Annals, state that a disgruntled Shang prince named Jizi, who had refused to cede power to the Zhou, left China with a small army. According to these legends, he founded a state known as Gija Joseon in northwest Korea during the Gojoseon period of ancient Korean history. However, scholars debate the historical accuracy of these legends.

Early Bronze Age archaeology

Before the 20th century, the Zhou dynasty (1046–256 BC) was the earliest Chinese dynasty that could be verified from its own records. However, during the Song dynasty (960–1279 AD), antiquarians collected bronze ritual vessels attributed to the Shang era, some of which bore inscriptions.

Yellow River valley 
In 1899, several scholars noticed that Chinese pharmacists were selling "dragon bones" marked with curious and archaic characters. These were finally traced back in 1928 to a site (now called Yinxu) near Anyang, north of the Yellow River in modern Henan province, where the Academia Sinica undertook archeological excavation until the Japanese invasion in 1937.

Archaeologists focused on the Yellow River valley in Henan as the most likely site of the states described in the traditional histories. After 1950, the remnants of the earlier walled settlement of Shang City were discovered near Zhengzhou.
The rammed earth construction of these walls was an inherited tradition, since much older fortifications of this type have been found at Chinese Neolithic sites of the Longshan culture .

In 1959, the site of the Erlitou culture was found in Yanshi, south of the Yellow River near Luoyang. Radiocarbon dating suggests that the Erlitou culture flourished c. 2100 BC to 1800 BC. They built large palaces, suggesting the existence of an organized state.
This was a large walled city dating from 1600 BC.

The city, now known as Huanbei, was apparently occupied for less than a century and destroyed shortly before the construction of the Yinxu complex. Between 1989 and 2000, an important Shang settlement was excavated near Xiaoshuangqiao, about 20 km northwest of Zhengzhou. Covering an intermediary period between the Zhengzhou Site and the late capitals on the Huan River, it features most prominently sacrificial pits with articulated skeletons of cattle, a quintessential part of the late Shang ritual complex. 

Chinese historians were accustomed to the notion of one dynasty succeeding another, and readily identified the Erligang and Erlitou sites with the early Shang and Xia dynasty of traditional histories. The actual political situation in early China may have been more complicated, with the Xia and Shang being political entities that existed concurrently, just as the early Zhou, who established the successor state of the Shang, are known to have existed at the same time as the Shang. It has also been suggested the Xia legend originated as a Shang myth of an earlier people who were their opposites.

Other sites 
The Erligang culture centred on the Zhengzhou site is found across a wide area of China, even as far northeast as the area of modern Beijing, where at least one burial in this region during this period contained both Erligang-style bronze utensils and local-style gold jewelry. The discovery of a Chenggu-style ge dagger-axe at Xiaohenan demonstrates that even at this early stage of Chinese history, there were some ties between the distant areas of north China. The Panlongcheng site in the middle Yangtze valley was an important regional center of the Erligang culture.

Accidental finds elsewhere in China have revealed advanced civilizations contemporaneous with but culturally unlike the settlement at Anyang, such as the walled city of Sanxingdui in Sichuan. Western scholars are hesitant to designate such settlements as belonging to the Shang dynasty. Also unlike the Shang, there is no known evidence that the Sanxingdui culture had a system of writing. The late Shang state at Anyang is thus generally considered the first verifiable civilization in Chinese history.

In contrast, the earliest layers of the Wucheng site, pre-dating Anyang, have yielded pottery fragments containing short sequences of symbols, suggesting that they may be a form of writing quite different in form from oracle bone characters, but the sample is too small for decipherment.

In 2022, a 3,000-year-old gold burial mask was found in a royal tomb belonging to a high-level noble from the Shang dynasty. The mask predates a similar gold mask discovered at the Sanxingdui archaeological site in 2021, making it the oldest example of this burial practice in China and also illustrating a link between Sanxingdui and the Zhongyuan civilization. The mask fully covers the face, to ensure that the wearer’s spirits would remain whole. 200 other artifacts were discovered in the Shangcheng tombs, including gold leaves and plaques inlaid with turquoise, coins made from shell, and bronze and jade weapons.

Genetic studies
A study of mitochondrial DNA (inherited in the maternal line) from Yinxu graves showed similarity with modern northern Han Chinese, but significant differences from southern Han Chinese.

Absolute chronology
The earliest securely dated event in Chinese history is the start of the Gonghe Regency in 841 BC, early in the Zhou dynasty, a date first established by the Han dynasty historian Sima Qian. Attempts to establish earlier dates have been plagued by doubts about the origin and transmission of traditional texts and the difficulties in their interpretation. More recent attempts have compared the traditional histories with archaeological and astronomical data.
At least 44 dates for the end of the dynasty have been proposed, ranging from 1130 BC to 1018 BC.

 The traditional dates of the dynasty, from 1766 BC to 1122 BC, were calculated by Liu Xin during the Han dynasty.
 A calculation based on the "old text" of the Bamboo Annals yields dates of 1523 BC to 1027 BC.
 David Pankenier, by attempting to identify astronomical events mentioned in Zhou texts, dated the beginning of the dynasty at 1554 BC and its overthrow at 1046 BC. 
 The Xia–Shang–Zhou Chronology Project identified the establishment of the dynasty with the foundation of an Erligang culture walled city at Yanshi, dated at c. 1600 BC. The project also arrived at an end date of 1046 BC, based on a combination of the astronomical evidence considered by David Pankenier and radiocarbon dating of archaeological layers.
 David Nivison and Edward Shaughnessy argue for and end date of 1045 BC, based on their analysis of the Bamboo Annals.
 Radiocarbon dating of oracle bones has yielded an end date of 1041 BC, with an uncertainty of about 10 years.

Late Shang at Anyang

The oldest extant direct records date from approximately 1250 BC at Anyang, covering the reigns of the last nine Shang kings.
The Shang had a fully developed system of writing, preserved on bronze inscriptions and a small number of other writings on pottery, jade and other stones, horn, etc., but most prolifically on oracle bones. The complexity and sophistication of this writing system indicates an earlier period of development, but direct evidence of that development is still lacking. Other advances included the invention of many musical instruments and celestial observations of Mars and various comets by Shang astronomers.

Their civilization was based on agriculture and augmented by hunting and animal husbandry. In addition to war, the Shang also practiced human sacrifice. Crania of sacrificial victims have been found to be similar to modern Chinese ones (based on comparisons with remains from Hainan and Taiwan). Cowry shells were also excavated at Anyang, suggesting trade with coast-dwellers, but there was very limited sea trade since China was isolated from other large civilizations during the Shang period. Trade relations and diplomatic ties with other formidable powers via the Silk Road and Chinese voyages to the Indian Ocean did not exist until the reign of Emperor Wu during the Han dynasty (206 BC – 221 AD).

Court life

At the excavated royal palace of Yinxu, large stone pillar bases were found along with rammed earth foundations and platforms, which according to Fairbank, were "as hard as cement". These foundations in turn originally supported 53 buildings of wooden post-and-beam construction. In close proximity to the main palatial complex, there were underground pits used for storage, servants' quarters, and housing quarters.

Many Shang royal tombs had been tunneled into and ravaged by grave robbers in ancient times, but in the spring of 1976, the discovery of Tomb 5 at Yinxu revealed a tomb that was not only undisturbed, but one of the most richly furnished Shang tombs that archaeologists had yet come across. With over 200 bronze ritual vessels and 109 inscriptions of Lady Fu Hao's name, Zheng Zhenxiang and other archaeologists realized they had stumbled across the tomb of King Wu Ding's most famous consort, Fu Hao, who is mentioned in 170 to 180 Shang oracle bone inscriptions, and who was also renowned as a military general. Along with bronze vessels, stoneware and pottery vessels, bronze weapons, jade figures and hair combs, and bone hairpins were found. The archaeological team argue that the large assortment of weapons and ritual vessels in her tomb correlate with the oracle bone accounts of her military and ritual activities.

The capital was the center of court life. Over time, court rituals to appease spirits developed, and in addition to his secular duties, the king would serve as the head of the ancestor worship cult. Often, the king would even perform oracle bone divinations himself, especially near the end of the dynasty. Evidence from excavations of the royal tombs indicates that royalty were buried with articles of value, presumably for use in the afterlife. Perhaps for the same reason, hundreds of commoners, who may have been slaves, were buried alive with the royal corpse.

A line of hereditary Shang kings ruled over much of northern China, and Shang troops fought frequent wars with neighboring settlements and nomadic herdsmen from the inner Asian steppes. The Shang king, in his oracular divinations, repeatedly showed concern about the fang, barbarians living outside of the civilized tu regions, which made up the center of Shang territory. In particular, the tufang group of the Yanshan region were regularly mentioned as hostile to the Shang.

Apart from their role as the head military commanders, Shang kings also asserted their social supremacy by acting as the high priests of society and leading the divination ceremonies. As the oracle bone texts reveal, the Shang kings were viewed as the best qualified members of society to offer sacrifices to their royal ancestors and to the high god Di, who in their beliefs was responsible for the rain, wind, and thunder.

The King appointed officials to manage certain activities, usually in a specified area. These included field (agricultural) officials 田, pastors 牧, dog officers 犬 (hunting), and guards 衛. These officers led their own retinues in the conduct of their duties, and some grew more independent and emerged as rulers of their own. There was a basic system of bureaucracy in place, with references to positions such as the "Many Dog officers", "Many horse officers", the "Many Artisans", the "Many Archers" or court titles like "Junior Servitor for Cultivation" or "Junior Servitor for labourers". More distant rulers were known as marquess 侯 or count 伯, who sometimes provided tribute and support to the Shang King in exchange for military aid and augury services. However these alliances were unstable, as indicated by the frequent royal divinations about the sustainability of such relations.

The existence of records regarding enemy kills, prisoners and booty taken point to the existence of a proto-bureaucracy of written documents.

Religion

Shang religious rituals featured divination and sacrifice. The degree to which shamanism was a central aspect of Shang religion is a subject of debate.

There were six main recipients of sacrifice: (1) Di (the High God), (2) nature powers like the sun and mountain powers, (3) former lords, deceased humans who had been added to the dynastic pantheon, (4) pre-dynastic ancestors, (5) dynastic ancestors, and (6) royal wives who were ancestors of the present king.

The Shang believed that their ancestors held power over them and performed divination rituals to secure their approval for planned actions. Divination involved cracking a turtle carapace or ox scapula to answer a question, and to then record the response to that question on the bone itself. It is unknown what criteria the diviners used to determine the response, but it is believed to be the sound or pattern of the cracks on the bone.

The Shang also seem to have believed in an afterlife, as evidenced by the elaborate burial tombs built for deceased rulers. Often "carriages, utensils, sacrificial vessels, [and] weapons" would be included in the tomb. A king's burial involved the burial of up to a few hundred humans and horses as well to accompany the king into the afterlife, in some cases even numbering four hundred. Finally, tombs included ornaments such as jade, which the Shang may have believed to protect against decay or confer immortality.

The Shang religion was highly bureaucratic and meticulously ordered. Oracle bones contained descriptions of the date, ritual, person, ancestor, and questions associated with the divination. Tombs displayed highly ordered arrangements of bones, with groups of skeletons laid out facing the same direction.

Bronze working

Chinese bronze casting and pottery advanced during the Shang dynasty, with bronze typically being used for ritually significant, rather than primarily utilitarian, items. As early as c. 1500 BC, the early Shang dynasty engaged in large-scale production of bronze-ware vessels and weapons. This production required a large labor force that could handle the mining, refining, and transportation of the necessary copper, tin, and lead ores. This in turn created a need for official managers that could oversee both hard-laborers and skilled artisans and craftsmen. The Shang royal court and aristocrats required a vast number of different bronze vessels for various ceremonial purposes and events of religious divination. Ceremonial rules even decreed how many bronze containers of each type a nobleman or noblewoman of a certain rank could own. With the increased amount of bronze available, the army could also better equip itself with an assortment of bronze weaponry. Bronze was also used for the fittings of spoke-wheeled chariots, which appeared in China around 1200 BC.

Military

Bronze weapons were an integral part of Shang society. Shang infantry were armed with a variety of stone and bronze weaponry, including máo (矛) spears, yuè (鉞) pole-axes, gē (戈) pole-based dagger-axes, composite bows, and bronze or leather helmets.

The chariot first appeared in China around 1200 BC, during the reign of Wu Ding. There is little doubt that the chariot entered China through Central Asia and the Northern Steppe, possibly indicating some form of contact with the Indo-Europeans. Recent archaeological finds have shown that the late Shang used horses, chariots, bows, and practiced horse burials that are similar to the steppe peoples to the west. Oracle bone inscriptions suggest that the Shang used chariots in royal hunts and in battle only as mobile command vehicles. In contrast, the western enemies of the Shang, such as the Zhou, began to use limited numbers of chariots in battle towards the end of the Shang period.

Although the Shang depended upon the military skills of their nobility, Shang rulers could mobilize the masses of town-dwelling and rural commoners as conscript laborers and soldiers for both campaigns of defense and conquest. Aristocrats and other state rulers were obligated to furnish their local garrisons with all necessary equipment, armor, and armaments. The Shang king maintained a force of about a thousand troops at his capital and would personally lead this force into battle. A rudimentary military bureaucracy was also needed in order to muster forces ranging from three to five thousand troops for border campaigns to thirteen thousand troops for suppressing rebellions.

Kings 

The earliest records are the oracle bones inscribed during the reigns of the Shang kings from Wu Ding.
The oracle bones do not contain king lists, but they do record the sacrifices to previous kings and the ancestors of the current king, which follow a standard schedule that scholars have reconstructed. From this evidence, scholars have assembled the implied king list and genealogy, finding that it is in substantial agreement with the later accounts, especially for later kings.
According to this implied king list, Wu Ding was the twenty-first Shang king.

The Shang kings were referred to in the oracle bones by posthumous names.
The last character of each name is one of the 10 celestial stems, which also denoted the day of the 10-day Shang week on which sacrifices would be offered to that ancestor within the ritual schedule.
There were more kings than stems, so the names have distinguishing prefixes such as da (greater, 大), 中 zhong (middle, 中), 小 xiao (lesser, 小), bu (outer, 卜), zu (ancestor, 祖) and a few more obscure names.

The kings, in the order of succession derived from the oracle bones, are here grouped by generation. Later reigns were assigned to oracle bone diviner groups by Dong Zuobin.

The oracle bones have been radiocarbon dated and results are given below. The dates given are uncertainty ranges, not regnal years. That is to say, there is a 80 to 90 percent chance that the divinations recorded were performed within the given date range.

See also
Chinese sovereign
Historical capitals of China
Women in ancient and imperial China

Notes

References

Citations

Works cited 

 
 
 
 
 
 
 
  A 1985 paperback 2nd edition is still in print, .
 
 
 
 
 
 
 
 
 
 
 
 
  (English translation of Wénzìxué Gàiyào 文字學概要, Shangwu, 1988.)

Further reading

External links 

Zhengzhou Shang City Site

 
 

 
States and territories established in the 16th century BC
States and territories disestablished in the 11th century BC
Dynasties in Chinese history
Former countries in Chinese history
11th century BC
11th century BC in China
16th-century BC establishments in China